Kudla or Kudła is a surname. Notable people with the surname include:

 Bettina Kudla (born 1962), German politician
 Dawid Kudła (born 1992), Polish footballer
 Denis Kudla (born 1992), American tennis player
 Denis Kudla (wrestler) (born 1994), Polish-born German wrestler
 Loku Kudla (born 1988), Indian poet and lyricist
 Mateusz Kudła (born 1991), Polish film producer
 Michał Kudła (born 1991), Polish canoeist
 Patrick Kudla (born 1996), Canadian ice hockey player
 Stephen S. Kudla (born 1950), American mathematician

See also
 

Polish-language surnames
Ukrainian-language surnames